Iloilo City Proper (City Proper) (also locally known as Downtown, Ciudad, Iloilo Poblacion, or simply Iloílo) is one of the seven districts of Iloilo City in the Western Visayas region of the Philippines. It is the second-most densely populated district, after Molo. It serves as the civic center of the city, housing the seat of the city and provincial governments, as well as other local, provincial, and regional government offices. The district also houses the majority of the city's financial institutions, where banks and other firms can be found on every corner of the streets. Iloilo City Proper is the current economic and financial center of Iloilo. According to the 2020 census, it has a population of 46,350 people.

Iloilo City Proper influenced the city's and province's present name from its Irong-Irong reference. During its heyday, it was called Yloylo or Iloílo, which was its original name. 

In current modern times, old 19th and 20th-century buildings can still be found across the district, particularly along the entire street of J.M. Basa, popularly known as Calle Real.

Etymology 
The name "Iloilo" is derived from the older name "Ilong-ilong" (Philippine Spanish: Ilong̃-ílong̃) meaning "nose-like", referring to the promontory between two rivers (Iloilo and Batiano) where the Fort San Pedro and the 17th-century Spanish port in the district were located.

History

Spanish colonial period (1600s-1800s)

Early colonial period 
Iloilo City Proper, or simply Iloilo, was founded and inhabited as La Punta in 1602 when Spanish and Chinese residents from Jaro and Molo, respectively, expanded their territorial areas. In 1700, it became the capital and the seat of power of the Spaniards in the province, which they transferred from La Villa Rica de Arevalo due to continuous attacks by Moros and Dutch.

Late colonial period and economic boom 
Iloilo emerged as a trading port in the 19th century. Its geographical and economic significance eventually evolved when China, Norway, and the United Kingdom opened up their consulates to conduct trade and commerce in the town, especially during its foundation as an international port in the 1850s. As a result, the commercial activity in Iloilo increased, as well as the infrastructures, recreational facilities, education institutions, banks, foreign consulates, and commercial firms.

Cityhood 

On October 5, 1889, due to the economic development in Iloilo, making it the most important port in the Philippines next to the capital, Manila, Iloilo was raised from the status of a town to a city through a Royal Decree, and in 1890, the city government was established.

Revolutionary period (1896-1898) 
Due to the loyalty of the Ilonggos, the city of Iloilo was honored with the perpetual title of La Muy Leal y Noble Ciudad (The Most Loyal and Noble City). The Royal Decree granting this title was signed on March 1, 1898, by Queen Regent Maria Christina of Spain. Over time, this title earned for Iloilo the reputation of being the Queen's Favored City in the South or simply Queen's City in the South, which later evolved into the Queen City of the South, being the second Spanish port of importance next to Manila and being located south of the archipelago's capital city.

On December 25, 1898, the Spanish government surrendered to the Ilonggo revolutionaries led by Gen. Martin Delgado at Plaza Alfonso XII (now Plaza Libertad). It was site where the Philippine flag was raised for the first time on the island of Panay.

American colonial period (1900-1941)

Iloilo City consolidation 
In the 20th century, all economic activities shifted from Jaro and Molo to the city of Iloilo when businesses aggressively flourished here. It was re-chartered by the American government on July 16, 1937, and absorbed the old towns of Molo, Arevalo, Mandurriao, and La Paz. On January 7, 1941, the city of Jaro was also incorporated into greater Iloilo City.

21st century 
Iloilo City Proper, as a district, remains the economic and political center of the city and the whole province.

Economy 

Being the original territory of the city of Iloilo, it has served as the center of trade, commerce, banking and finance, education, retail trading, real estate, and industry in Iloilo since its foundation in the early 17th century. Iloilo City Proper has one of the largest numbers of banks and other financial institutions in the country, hence being named as the financial capital of Western Visayas. Calle Real, along with Iznart St., Gen. Luna St., and Ledesma St., has the most service and commercial establishments among all the districts and has remained one of the most important areas for local businesses in the city.

The district is home to the main government building of the Province of Iloilo, the Iloilo Provincial Capitol, and the seat of the city government, Iloilo City Hall. Other main agencies of the government are also located in the City Proper.

For the past few years, there have been proposals for island-type reclamation along the southern coastlines of the City Proper to expand the district's commercial area, which is running out of space for new developments and has caused Mandurriao the concentration of modern developments in Iloilo City for the past two decades.

On August 2, 2022, the Iloilo City Government and SM Prime Holdings, Inc. signed a 25-year lease agreement for the redevelopment of the two largest Iloilo City public markets, Iloilo Central Market and Iloilo Terminal Market, both located in Iloilo City Proper.

Education 
Iloilo City Proper is home to half of the universities in Iloilo City. Some of the notable universities and schools in the district are the following:

Higher education institutions:

 University of the Philippines Visayas – founded in 1947.
 University of San Agustin – the first university in Western Visayas, founded in 1904.
 University of Iloilo – founded in 1947.
 St. Paul University Iloilo – founded in 1946.
 Hua Siong College of Iloilo – founded in 1912.
 Colegio de las Hijas de Jesus – founded in 1936.
 Colegio del Sagrado Corazon de Jesus – founded in 1917.
 Cabalum Western College – founded in 1945.

Basic educational institutions:

 Assumption Iloilo
 Sun Yat Sen High School
 Ateneo de Iloilo – Santa Maria Catholic School
 Iloilo Central Elementary School
 SPED Integrated School for Exceptional Children
 Iloilo American Memorial School
 Manuel L. Quezon Elementary School - Kahirupan
 Rizal Elementary School - Bonifacio Tanza
 I. Arroyo Elementary School
 San Jose Elementary School - Rizal Street
 Rizal Elementary School
 Center for West Visayan Studies
 A. Montes Elementary School I
 A.Montes Elementary School 2
 Fort San Pedro National High School

Transportation

Public transport 
The primary modes of public transportation in Iloilo City Proper are passenger jeepneys and metered taxis. The transportation routes in Iloilo City are mostly focused on the district, which is the center of commerce in the city.

In contrast to President Rodrigo Duterte's administration's plan to phase out old, dilapidated jeepneys as the primary mode of mass public transportation in the Philippines, the city has recently begun to adopt mini-buses like modern PUJs or modern Jeepneys that are now plying in the city, including Iloilo City Proper.

Cycling 
Iloilo City has been hailed as the Bike Capital of the Philippines. There are also several painted bicycle lanes in Iloilo City Proper that can be found on its main roads, including Gen. Luna Street, Delgado Street, Mabini Street, Infante Street, and the esplanade along Muelle Loney Street.

Railway 

From 1907 to the 1980s, Panay Railways operated a railroad from Roxas City to the port area of Iloilo City Proper. In 2022, Panay Railways announced its opening to foreign ownership to reconstruct its former train lines, which will reconnect the district and city to other major cities in Panay, including Caticlan in Malay, Aklan.

Airport and seaport 

The Iloilo International Airport in Cabatuan, Iloilo, is the primary airport serving the district of Iloilo City Proper, as well as the whole Metro Iloilo–Guimaras. It serves domestic air routes to Manila, Clark, Cebu, Cuyo Island, Puerto Princesa, Sipalay, Cagayan de Oro, General Santos, and Davao City. It is also served by international routes to and from Singapore and Hong Kong.

The Port of Iloilo, which is located near Fort San Pedro, Iloilo City Proper, serves domestic shipping and cargo routes to/from Manila, Cebu, Puerto Princesa, Bacolod, Cagayan de Oro, Zamboanga City, Davao, and General Santos. The Iloilo International Cargo Port, in the adjacent Lapuz district, is a port of call for foreign cargo vessels. The Guimaras-Iloilo Ferry Terminal, which is located in Parola, serves ferry routes to Jordan and Buenavista in Guimaras, and vice versa.

Barangays 
Iloilo City Proper has the most barangays in Iloilo City with a total of 45 barangays. City Proper is the second-most densely populated Iloilo City district with a population density of 12,435 people per square kilometer.

Gallery

See also 

 Calle Real
 Dinagyang Festival
Iloilo City

References

External links

 Iloilo City Government Official Website
 Iloilo travel guide

Districts of Iloilo City
Former cities in the Philippines